John Ross (born February 29, 1964) is a former professional tennis player from the United States.

Career
Ross was a runner up in the boys' doubles at the 1982 Wimbledon Championships, where he and partner Rick Leach lost in the final to Pat Cash and John Frawley. He also competed in the boys' singles, reaching the quarter-finals.

He played collegiate tennis at Southern Methodist University and was an All-American in 1984, 1985 and 1986.

His best performance on the Grand Prix tour came in 1987, when he was the singles runner-up, to Peter Lundgren, at Rye Brook. En route he defeated top 100 players Jaime Yzaga and Thomas Muster. Later that year he had a win over world number 19 Slobodan Živojinović in Hong Kong. In 1988, he got within two points of upsetting Stefan Edberg at Forest Hills.

Ross made the second round of the Wimbledon Championships and the US Open in 1988. In the second round of the US Open, he took 12th seed Guillermo Pérez Roldán to five sets.

He retired from professional tennis in 1991, to study at Harvard Business School.

Grand Prix career finals

Singles: 1 (0–1)

Challenger titles

Doubles: (1)

References

1964 births
Living people
American male tennis players
Tennis people from Florida
SMU Mustangs men's tennis players
Harvard Business School alumni